Ian Ballantyne (born 1958) is a former footballer who played as a striker for Queens Park, Dundee United, Raith Rovers and East Stirlingshire. He also played in Hong Kong for Zindabad, Sing Tao and Ernest Borel.

Ballantyne joined Dundee United in April 1979 with his competitive debut coming in August. Three months later, Ballantyne joined Raith in a £12,500 deal, spending four years with the Kirkcaldy side. Later playing for East Stirlingshire, Ballantyne moved to Hong Kong shortly afterwards.

References

External links

Dundee United F.C. players
East Stirlingshire F.C. players
Expatriate footballers in Hong Kong
Association football forwards
Living people
Queen's Park F.C. players
Raith Rovers F.C. players
Scottish expatriate footballers
Scottish Football League players
Scottish footballers
1958 births
Scottish expatriate sportspeople in Hong Kong
Sea Bee players
Sportspeople from Argyll and Bute